Carlo is an Italian and Spanish masculine given name and a surname. As an Italian name it is a form of Charles. As a Spanish name it is a short form of Carlos. Notable people with this name include the following:

Given name

Carlo Agostoni (1909 – 1972), Italian fencer
Carlo Ancelotti (born 1959), Italian football player and manager
Carlo Arnaudi (1899 – 1970), Italian scientist and politician
Carlo Aquino (born 1985), Filipino actor and musician
Carlo Bagno (1920 – 1990), Italian actor
Carlo Bernini (1936–2011), Italian politician and businessman
Carlo Biado (born 1983), Filipino pool player
Carlo Alberto Biggini (1902–1945), Italian politician
Carlo Bonomi (1937 – 2022), Italian voice actor
Carlo Bomans (born 1963), Belgian cyclist
Carlo Ludovico Bragaglia (1894 – 1998), Italian film director
Carlo Buccirosso (born 1954), Italian actor, theatre director and playwright
Carlo Buonaparte (1746 – 1785), Italian diplomat and father of Napoleon
Carlo Cafiero (1846 – 1892), Italian anarchist
Carlo Canna (born 1992), Italian rugby player
Carlo J. Caparas (born 1958), Filipino comic strip creator/writer, director and producer
Carlo Carcano (1891 – 1965), Italian football player and manager
Carlo Carrà (1881 – 1966), Italian painter
Carlo Cassola (1917 – 1987), Italian novelist and essayist
Carlo Cattaneo (1801 – 1869), Italian philosopher, writer, and rebel
Carlo Ceresoli (1910 – 1995), Italian footballer
Carlo Checchinato (born 1970), Italian rugby player
Carlo Chendi (1933 – 2021), Italian cartoonist
Carlo Azeglio Ciampi (1920 –2016), Italian politician
Carlo Chiti (1924 – 1994), Italian automotive engineer
Carlo Cignani (1628 – 1719), Italian painter
Carlo M. Cipolla (1922 – 2000), Italian historian
Carlo Clerici (1929 – 2007), Swiss cyclist
Carlo Contarini (1580 – 1656), Italian nobleman
Carlo Costamagna (1881 – 1965), Italian lawyer and academic
Carlo Costly (born 1982), Honduran football player
Carlo Crivelli (c. 1430 – 1495), Italian Renaissance painter
Carlo Croccolo (1927 – 2019), Italian actor, voice actor, director and screenwriter
Carlo Cudicini (born 1973), Italian footballer
Carlo Alberto dalla Chiesa (1920 – 1982), Italian general
Carlo Delle Piane (1936 – 2019), Italian film actor
Carlo Dolci (1616 – 1686), Italian painter
Carlo Donat-Cattin (1919 – 1991) was an Italian politician
Carlo Emery (1848 – 1925), Italian entomologist
Carlo D'Este (1936 – 2020), American historian
Carlo Fassi (1929 – 1997), Italian figure skater and coach
Carlo Del Fava (born 1981), South African-born Italian rugby player
Carlo Festuccia (born 1980), Italian rugby player
Carlo Fontana (1634 or 1638–1714), Italian architect
Carlo Emilio Gadda (1893 – 1973), Italian writer and poet
Carlo Gaddi (born 1962), Italian rower
Carlo Gaetano Gaisruck (1769 – 1846), Austrian Cardinal
Carlo Galetti (1882 – 1949), Italian road racing cyclist
Carlo Gambino (1902 – 1976), Italian mobster 
Carlo Gatti (1817–1878), Swiss entrepreneur
Carlo Geloso (1879 – 1957), was an Italian general
Carlo Gesualdo (1566 – 1613), Italian Prince 
Carlo Ginzburg (born 1939), Italian historian
Carlo Giuffrè (1928 – 2018), Italian actor and director
Carlo Maria Giulini (1914 – 2005), Italian conductor
Carlo Goldoni (1707 – 1793), Italian playwright and librettist
Carlo Gozzi (1720 – 1806), Italian playwright
Carlo Grande (born 1974), Italian rower
Carlo Grippo (born 1955), Italian middle distance athlete
Carlo Janka (born 1986), Swiss skier
Carlo Katigbak (born 1970), Filipino executive
Carlo Lastimosa (born 1990), Filipino basketball player
Carlo Levi (1902 – 1975), Italian painter, writer
Carlo Lievore (1937 – 2002), Italian javelin athlete
Carlo Lizzani (1922 – 2013), Italian film director, screenwriter and critic
Carlo Maderno (1556 – 1629), Italian architect
Carlo Maratta (1625 – 1713), Italian painter
Carlo Maria Martini (1927 – 2012), Italian Jesuit and cardinal of the Catholic Church
Carlo Marino (born 1968), Italian politician
Carlo Marochetti (1805 – 1867), Italian-born French sculptor
Carlo Martinenghi (1894 - 1944), Italian long-distance athlete
Carlo Masci (born 1958), Italian politician
Carlo Matteucci (1811 – 1868), Italian physicist and neurophysiologist
Carlo Mattioli (born 1954), Italian race walker 
Carlo Mattogno (born 1951), Italian writer
Carlo Mazzacurati (1956 – 2014), Italian film director and screenwriter
Carlo Mazzone (born 1937), Italian football player and manager
Carlo de' Medici (1595 – 1666), Italian Cardinal
Carlo Monti (1920 – 2016), Italian sprint athlete
Carlo Montuori (1885 - 1968), Italian cinematographer
Carlo Mornati (born 1972), Italian rower
Carlo Ninchi (1896 – 1974), Italian actor
Carlo Oriani (1888 – 1917), Italian cyclist
Carlo Parola (1921 – 2000), Italian football player and coach
Carlo Pellegrini (1839 – 1889), Italian artist
Carlo Pedersoli (1929 - 2016), Italian swimmer and actor (Bud Spencer)
Carlo Pietzner (1915 – 1986), American artist and anthroposophist
Carlo Pinsoglio (born 1990), Italian footballer
Carlo Pisacane (1818 – 1857), Italian patriot
Carlo Ponti (1912 – 2007), Italian film producer
Carlo Alberto Quario (1913 – 1984), Italian football player and coach
Carlo Rambaldi (1925 – 2012), Italian special effects artist
Carlo Recalcati (born 1945), Italian basketball coach and player
Carlo Rigotti (1906 – 1983), Italian football player
Carlo Felice Nicolis, conte di Robilant (1826 – 1888), Italian statesman and diplomat
Carlo Rolandi (born 1926), Italian sailor
Carlo Romano (1908 – 1975), Italian actor, voice actor and screenwriter
Carlo Rosselli (1899 – 1937), Italian Jewish political leader
Carlo Rossi (architect) (1775 – 1849), Italian architect
Carlo Rota (born 1961), British actor
Carlo Rovelli (born 1956), Italian physicist
Carlo Rubbia (born 1934), Italian physicist 
Carlo Rustichelli (1916 – 2004), Italian film composer
Carlo Ruzzini (1653 – 1735), Italian diplomat
Carlo Saraceni (1579 – 1620), Italian painter
Carlo Salvemini (born 1966), Italian politician
Carlo Savina (1919 - 2002), Italian composer and conductor
Carlo Scarpa (1906 – 1978), Italian architect
Carlo Schanzer (1865–1953), Italian jurist and politician
Carlo Scognamiglio (born 1944), Italian economist and politician
Carlo Sforza (1872 – 1952), Italian politician
Carlo Sibilia (born 1986), Italian politician
Carlo De Simone (1885 – 1951), Italian Army officer
Carlo Simionato (born 1961), Italian sprint athlete
Carlo Luigi Spegazzini (1858 – 1926), Italian-born Argentinian botanist and mycologist
Carlo Speroni (1895 – 1969), Italian long-distance athlete
Carlo Gaetano Stampa (1667–1742), Italian Cardinal and Archbishop
Carlo Tamberlani (1899 – 1980), Italian actor
Carlo Thränhardt (born 1957), German high jumper
Carlo I Tocco (??? – 1429), Italian Count and Despot
Carlo Tognoli (1938–2021), Italian politician
Carlo Trigilia (born 1951), Italian academic and politician
Carlo Ubbiali (1929–2020), Italian motorcycle racer
Carlo van Dam (born 1986), Dutch racing driver
Carlo Vanzina (1951 – 2018), Italian film director, producer and screenwriter
Carlo Verdone (born 1950), Italian actor, screenwriter and film director
 Carlo Vergara (born 1971), Filipino graphic designer and illustrator
Carlo Maria Viganò (born 1941, Italian Catholic archbishop
Carlo Vittori (1931 – 2015), Italian sprinter and athletics coach
Carlo, Duke of Calabria (1775 – 1778), heir to Naples and Sicily.
Prince Carlo, Duke of Castro (born 1963), French-born Italian nobleman

Nickname/stage name
Carlo Collodi, pen name of Carlo Lorenzini (1826 – 1890), Italian author known for The Adventures of Pinocchio
Carlo Corazzin, nickname of Giancarlo Michele Corazzin (born 1971), Canadian football player
Carlo Little, stage name of Carl O'Neil Little (1938 – 2005), British drummer
Carlo Montagnese, real name of Illangelo (born 1987), Canadian musician

Middle name
Andrea Carlo Ferrari (1850 – 1921), Italian Roman Catholic prelate
Bartolomeo Carlo Romilli (1795 - 1859), Italian Archbishop
Ferdinando Carlo Gonzaga, Duke of Mantua and Montferrat (1652 – 1708), Italian nobility
Gian Carlo Muzzarelli (born 1955), Italian politician
Gian-Carlo Rota (1932 – 1999), Italian mathematician
Luigi Carlo Farini (1812 – 1866), Italian statesman

Surname
Brandon Carlo (born 1996), American ice hockey player
Monti Carlo (born 1975), Puerto Rican host, chef and blogger
Philip Carlo (1949 – 2010), American journalist and author
Phoebe Carlo (1874 - 1898), British actress

Fictional characters
Carlo Hesser, character from One Life to Live
Carlo Gervasi, character from The Sopranos
Carlo Renzi, character from The Sopranos
Carlo Rizzi character in Mario Puzo's novel The Godfather
Carlo Zota, character from Marvel Comics
Don Carlo, Baritone in Verdi opera, Ernani

See also

Carbo (disambiguation)
Cardo (disambiguation)
Cargo (disambiguation)
Carmo (disambiguation)
Carl (name)
Carla
Carle, surnames
Carle (given name)
Carli (given name)
Carli (surname)
Carlon
Carlos (given name)
Carlos (surname)
Carlow (disambiguation)
Carly
Calò (surname)
Caló (surname)
Caro (surname)
Carol (given name)
Carro (surname)
De Carlo
DeCarlo
Di Carlo
DiCarlo
Karlo (name)

Notes

Italian masculine given names
Spanish masculine given names